Alexina Ruthquist (née McKay, 8 September 1848 – 5 September 1892) was a Scottish missionary.

Life
Ruthquist was born in Fordyce in Scotland in 1848 as Alexina McKay. She was named after her mother and her father was the Reverend Murdoch McKay. Her father was based at the Free Church of Scotland in nearby Rhynie.

She served for eleven years in India before she married the Swedish missionary Reverend Johan Ruthquist in October 1866. She left Nagpoor and joined him at the small village of Amarwara. She lived near her sister Maggie who had also married a Swedish missionary. In November 1889 she gave birth but the child, Mary Juanita, died within two weeks. She and Maggie decided to bring up an abandoned child called Benjamin. 1892 they opened a dispensary in Amarvara.

She was buried in Suez.

References

1848 births
1892 deaths
Scottish Protestant missionaries
Protestant missionaries in India
People from Aberdeenshire
Female Christian missionaries